Brackley-Hunter River is a provincial electoral district for the Legislative Assembly of Prince Edward Island, Canada. It was created prior to the 2019 election from parts of the former districts West Royalty-Springvale and York-Oyster Bed.

The riding consists of rural communities north and north-west of Charlottetown, including Hunter River, Oyster Bed Bridge, and Warren Grove.

Members

Election results

Brackley-Hunter River, 2019–present

Referendum and plebiscite results

2019 electoral reform referendum
The 2019 Prince Edward Island electoral reform referendum was held on April 23, 2019.

References

External links
Elections PEI: District 15 Brackley-Hunter River

Politics of Charlottetown
Prince Edward Island provincial electoral districts